= Cramerview =

- Location within Gauteng Location within South Africa
- Coordinates: 26.073°S 28.012°E
- Country: South Africa
- Province: Gauteng
- Municipality: City of Johannesburg
- Established: 1954
- Time zone: UTC+2 (SAST)
- Postal code (street): 2191
- PO box: 2060

Cramerview is a suburb of Johannesburg, South Africa. It is located in Region B of the City of Johannesburg Metropolitan Municipality.

== History ==
The suburb is situated on part of an old Witwatersrand farm called Driefontein. It was established in 1958 and name after the developer's surname, Cramer.
